Acta Agriculturae Scandinavica. Section B. Soil and Plant Science is a peer-reviewed scientific journal published by Taylor & Francis on behalf of the Nordic Association of Agricultural Scientists. It covers environmental sciences, botany, earth sciences, physical geography, ecology, and the soil sciences of relevance to agriculture.

Before the 1992 split into section B (soil and plant science) and section A (animal science), the journal was published by the Royal Swedish Academy of Agriculture and Forestry from 1950-1955. It was then published from 1973-1991 by the Nordic Association of Agricultural Scientists.

The editor-in-chief is Anna Mårtensson (Swedish University of Agricultural Sciences).

Abstracting and indexing 
This journal is abstracted and indexed by:
 Science Citation Index
 Current Contents/Agriculture, Biology & Environmental Sciences
 BIOSIS Previews
 Chemical Abstracts Service 
 Current Awareness in Biological Sciences
According to the Journal Citation Reports, the journal has a 2020 impact factor of 1.694.

References

External links 
 

Agricultural journals
Environmental science journals
Soil science journals
Taylor & Francis academic journals
Publications established in 1950
English-language journals
8 times per year journals